Fernand Sardou (September 18, 1910 – January 31, 1976) was a French singer and actor.

Sardou was the father of Michel Sardou, and he married Jackie Rollin (Jackie Sardou), an actress. His two grandsons are French novelist Romain Sardou and French actor Davy Sardou.

Partial filmography 

 Le moulin dans le soleil (1938)
 Grand-père (1939) – Le jeune homme
 Bifur 3 (1945)
 Les cadets de l'océan (1945) – Auguste
 Miroir (1947) – Un membre de la bande à Folco
 Le voleur se porte bien (1948) – Cabassol – le chauffeur
 Si ça peut vous faire plaisir (1948) – Joseph Castanino
 Three Sinners (1950) – Le garagiste
 Oriental Port (1950) – Gustave
 Coeur-sur-Mer (1950) – Titin
 Savage Triangle (1951) – L'inspecteur
 La Table-aux-Crevés (1951) – Forgeral
 My Wife, My Cow and Me (1952)
 Forbidden Fruit (1952) – Fontvielle
 Manon des sources (1952) – Philoxène, le maire
 The Call of Destiny (1953) – Dottore Aldo Guarneri
 The Wild Oat (1953) – Le Brigadier
 When You Read This Letter (1953) – Le garagiste
 Napoleon Road (1953) – Le maire de Bourg-sur-Bléone
 Virgile (1953) – Latripe
 Service Entrance (1954) – Scarfatti
 Letters from My Windmill (1954) – Monsieur Charnigue – l'apothicaire (segment "Élixir du père Gaucher, l'")
 Sur le banc (1954) – Monsieur Canavez
 Spring, Autumn and Love (1955) – Calvette (uncredited)
 Rififi (1955) – First Gambler (uncredited)
 M'sieur la Caille (1955) – Rir
 Four Days in Paris (1955) – Montaron
 Marguerite de la nuit (1955) – Le patron du café
 Mémoires d'un flic (1956) – L'homme politique
 The Terror with Women (1956) – Le commissaire de police
 Élisa (1957) – M. Alfred
 Que les hommes sont bêtes (1957) – M. Marcel
 Love in Jamaica (1957) – Maxime de Sainte-Maxime
 Irresistible Catherine (1957) – Bouche
 Les Espions (1957) – Pierre
 Filous et compagnie (1957) – Le faux colonel
 La Parisienne (1957) – Fernand le Barman
 Échec au porteur (1958) – Monsieur Arpaillargues
 Why Women Sin (1958) – Mario le Toulonnais
 Sunday Encounter (1958) – Le brigadier
 Suivez-moi jeune homme (1958) – Emile
 Vice Squad (1959) – Le commissaire Masson
 I Tartassati (1959) – Ernesto
 Picnic on the Grass (1959) – Nino
 Business (1960) – Commissaire Masson
 Bouche cousue (1960) – Marius
 Axel Munthe, The Doctor of San Michele (1962) – Petit-Piere
 Les grands chemins (1963) – Gendarme
 Cadavres en vacances (1963) – Lever
 D'où viens-tu Johnny? (1963) – Gustave, dit "Le Shérif"
 La bande à Bobo (1963) – Le maire
 Les durs à cuire ou Comment supprimer son prochain sans perdre l'appétit (1964) – L'inspecteur
 The Troops of St. Tropez (1964) – Le paysan
 L'or du duc (1965) – Le livreur d'eau
 Dis-moi qui tuer (1965) – M. Pesel
 L'ardoise (1970)
 Sur un arbre perché (1971) – L'adjudant-chef
 Le soldat Laforêt (1972) – Le vagabond
 Trop jolies pour être honnêtes (1972) – Pizarel, un gardien de prison
 Na! (1973) – Le bedeau
 Dédé la tendresse (1974)
 Les grands moyens (1976) – Camille Conségude (final film role)

References

1910 births
1976 deaths
20th-century French  male singers